Juan Hernández García (born 6 December 1994) is a Spanish professional footballer who plays for Burgos CF as either a right winger or a forward.

Club career
Hernández was born in Lorca, Murcia, and was a La Hoya Lorca CF youth graduate. He made his senior debut for the club during the 2011–12 campaign, in Tercera División, while still a youth.

In 2012 Hernández joined Granada CF, returning to youth football. On 16 July of the following year he returned to La Hoya Lorca on loan, with his side now in Segunda División B.

On 8 June 2015 Hernández signed for Getafe CF, being immediately assigned to the reserves in the third tier. On 14 July of the following year he moved to another reserve team, Celta de Vigo B still in the third division.

On 4 July 2017, Hernández renewed with Celta for a further season, with an option for three more. He scored a career-best 14 goals during the campaign, as his side reached the play-offs, and was subsequently promoted to the first team in La Liga.

On 7 August 2018, Hernández was loaned to Segunda División side Cádiz CF for one season. He made his professional debut on 17 August, coming on as a second-half substitute for Manu Vallejo in a 1–0 home win against UD Almería.

On 4 September 2018, Hernández suffered a serious knee injury, being sidelined for the remainder of the season. Upon returning to Celta, he was assigned to the main squad, and made his top tier debut on 15 December 2019 by replacing fellow youth graduate Kevin in a 2–2 home draw against RCD Mallorca.

On 27 August 2020, Hernández renewed his contract with Celta until 2022, being immediately loaned to second division newcomers CE Sabadell FC for the season. On 7 July of the following year, he agreed to a two-year deal with fellow second level side AD Alcorcón, after cutting ties with the Galicians.

Despite being regularly used at Alkor, Hernández terminated his contract on 26 January 2022, and moved to fellow second division side SD Ponferradina two days later. On 1 September, he signed a 1+1 deal with Burgos CF of the same category.

References

External links

1994 births
Living people
People from Lorca, Spain
Spanish footballers
Footballers from the Region of Murcia
Association football wingers
Association football forwards
La Liga players
Segunda División players
Segunda División B players
Tercera División players
Divisiones Regionales de Fútbol players
Lorca FC players
Getafe CF B players
Celta de Vigo B players
RC Celta de Vigo players
Cádiz CF players
CE Sabadell FC footballers
AD Alcorcón footballers
SD Ponferradina players
Burgos CF footballers